German submarine U-970 was a Type VIIC U-boat of Nazi Germany's Kriegsmarine during World War II.

She was ordered on 5 June 1941, and was laid down on 29 May 1942 at Blohm & Voss, Hamburg, as yard number 170. She was launched on 11 February 1943 and commissioned under the command of Oberleutnant zur See Hans-Heinrich Ketels on 25 March 1943.

Design
German Type VIIC submarines were preceded by the shorter Type VIIB submarines. U-970 had a displacement of  when at the surface and  while submerged. She had two shafts and two  propellers.

U-970 was fitted with five  torpedo tubes (four fitted at the bow and one at the stern), fourteen torpedoes or 26 TMA mines, one  SK C/35 naval gun, 220 rounds, and one twin  C/30 anti-aircraft gun. The boat had a complement of between 44 — 52 men.

Service history
On 8 June 1944, U-970 was sunk by depth charges west of Bordeaux, France, in the Bay of Biscay at 0135 hrs. U-970 was attacked by a British Sunderland of 228 Squadron/R RAF. Fourteen of the crew of fifty-two survived.

References

Bibliography

External links

German Type VIIC submarines
U-boats commissioned in 1943
World War II submarines of Germany
Ships built in Hamburg
1943 ships
Maritime incidents in June 1944
World War II shipwrecks in the Atlantic Ocean